John Hurley (1796 – 27 November 1882) was a politician in colonial New South Wales, member of the New South Wales Legislative Assembly.

Hurley was born in Limerick, Ireland. He was a member for Narellan 27 June 1859 to 10 November 1860, 17 December 1864 to 15 November 1869 and 4 March 1872 to 9 November 1880. He did not hold caucus, parliamentary or ministerial office.

References

 

1796 births
1882 deaths
Members of the New South Wales Legislative Assembly
19th-century Australian politicians